The RD-0237 (GRAU Index 15D114) is a pressure-fed liquid rocket vernier engine, burning N2O4 and UDMH. It is used on the UR-100UTTKh MIRV vehicle to supply thrust vector control by gimbaling of its nozzle. While the engine is out of production, the ICBM and Strela remain operational as of 2015.

See also

UR-100N - ICBM for which this engine was originally developed for.
Strela
Rocket engine using liquid fuel

References

External links 
 KbKhA official information on the engine. (Archived)
 Encyclopedia Astronautica information on the propulsion module. (Archived)

Rocket engines of the Soviet Union
Rocket engines using hypergolic propellant
Rocket engines using the pressure-fed cycle
KBKhA rocket engines